The 2007–08 season of the Philippine Basketball League (PBL).

2007 V-Go Extreme Energy Drink Cup

The Harbour-Philippine team bound for the Southeast Asian Games in Thailand, wrapped up their guest stint in the PBL with five wins and two losses against the seven regular ballclubs.

A unique phase in the tournament called the pool round, gives gasping squads a last shot at advancing to the quarterfinals. Top teams Hapee and Harbour Centre, along with San Mig Coffee were in Pool A. The four lower seeded teams are in Pool B.

Hapee Toothpaste, who advances to the best-of-three semifinals outright, remain unbeaten for nine games after winning over Harbour and San Mig Coffee in the Pool A round-robin.

Hapee vs Toyota-Balintawak (Best-of-three semifinals)

Harbour vs San Mig Coffee (Best-of-three semifinals)

V-Go Extreme Energy Drink Cup finals

Harbour ended Hapee's 12-game winning streak following a 73-59 victory in Game two and tied the series at one game apiece. The following day in the deciding third game of the best-of-three title series, Harbour Centre came back from 19 points down and forces overtime at 78-all, before winning, 94-88, as Batang Pier captured a record four straight PBL crown.

2008 Lipovitan Amino Sports Drink Cup

Burger King was the former Mail and More while Noosa Shoes is formerly Blu Detergent.

Burger King clinch the third semifinals berth by downing Pharex Medics, 77-71. San Mig Coffee claimed the fourth and last semis ticket by winning against Toyota-Otis Sparks, 68-64.

Harbour Centre scored a 3-0 sweep over San Mig Coffee in their best-of-five semifinal series to advance into their familiar territory in the finals. Hapee Toothpaste sealed another championship rematch with Harbour by scoring a 3-1 series victory over Burger King.

Lipovitan Amino Sports Drink Cup finals

Batang Pier made a huge 19-0 run in the second quarter to pull away in Game four and grab a historic fifth consecutive PBL title. League MVP Jason Castro was also voted the finals Most Valuable Player as he led the onslaught that gave Harbour a 41-26 lead over Hapee at halftime. Harbour won the last three games in convincing fashion after losing Game one by one point to the Complete Protectors.

2007-08 Season Awards
 Most Valuable Player: Jayson Castro (Harbour) 
 Most Improved Player: Chito Jaime (Toyota-Otis)
 Finals MVP: Jayson Castro (Harbour)
 Mythical First Team
 Jayson Castro (Harbour)
 Gabe Norwood (Hapee)
 Mark Borboran (Hapee)
 Larry Rodriguez (Hapee)
 Chad Alonzo (Harbour)
 Mythical Second Team
 TY Tang (Harbour)
 Solomon Mercado (Harbour)
 Jervy Cruz (Hapee)
 Bonbon Custodio (Magnolia)
 Neil Rañeses (Magnolia)

References

External links
 Gameface.ph

Philippine Basketball League seasons
PBL